"The One with the Sonogram at the End" is the second episode of the first season of the NBC television series Friends. It was first broadcast on September 29, 1994. In this episode, Ross (David Schwimmer) processes his ex-wife Carol's (Anita Barone) pregnancy and supports her as she goes through her first sonogram, though he clashes with Susan (Jessica Hecht) over the name of the baby. Rachel (Jennifer Aniston) struggles to balance her emotions as she ends her relationship with Barry (Mitchell Whitfield), and Monica (Courteney Cox) becomes increasingly irate with her parents, eventually spilling the details of Ross's failed relationship that he failed to mention to them.

Plot
Carol, Ross' ex-wife, visits Ross at the museum where he works to tell him that she is pregnant. When Carol tells Ross, he is so surprised that he freezes in place, looking like the exhibit he was setting up in the museum. Meanwhile, Monica is frantically cleaning the apartment as her parents are coming over for dinner and she is worried they will be critical about the cleanliness of her home. Rachel is looking around the apartment for her misplaced engagement ring, given to her by her ex-fiancé Barry, whom she is meeting the next day to give him back the ring. Rachel remembers she had it on earlier that morning when she was in the kitchen making lasagna. This leads her to realise the ring is in the lasagne. Monica is upset, as this was the one job she gave to Rachel and now the dinner for her parents is ruined.

Ross arrives and tells everyone Carol is pregnant, while Phoebe finds the engagement ring in the lasagne. Ross tells his friends that Carol and her lesbian life partner Susan want him to be involved, but only if he is comfortable with it. Ross informs the group that Carol and Susan have invited him to go to their first sonogram appointment the next day. He is still processing the fact that he has become a father, and does not know where he fits in with two lesbian mothers.

Later that night Monica and Ross are having dinner with their parents Jack and Judy. Judy is critical of Monica and makes snide remarks throughout dinner. After much pressure from Monica, Ross eventually reveals that Carol is a lesbian and that she is pregnant with his child and plans on raising it with Susan. Rather than responding to Ross, Judy accuses Monica of not telling them.

While Ross goes to the clinic to see Carol, Rachel visits Barry at his dental practice to return her ring to him. She apologises to Barry about running out of their wedding and feels bad for him going on their honeymoon alone. Barry reveals that he went on their honeymoon with Mindy, Rachel's best friend and maid of honor, who he has been seeing.

Ross is hesitant to be at the sonogram and asks how he can be involved. When he asks about naming the child, Carol and Susan give first names that Ross says will sound silly with his surname Geller. Carol and Susan break it to Ross that his surname will not be used as they intend to use their names Willick-Bunch, with Susan spitefully telling him that the baby is hers and Carol's, not his. Ross realizes he is not ready to be involved and turns to leave as the doctor finds the baby's heartbeat. He stays and decides to become involved.

At Monica and Rachel's apartment, Ross brings over a video of the sonogram and the group watch it on TV. Rachel talks to Mindy on the phone and tells her that if everything works out and the two get married, she hopes their kids will have Barry's receding hair and Mindy's old nose. Rachel hangs up and despite knowing it is a cheap shot, feels better for saying it.

Reception
In the original broadcast, the episode was viewed by 20.2 million viewers and achieved the rating of 14.0. The reviews for the episode were mixed. The A.V. Club noted in its review that the episode "seems a far more run-of-the-mill sitcom episode—definitely formulaic, and in places sadly derivative." LeakyNews review said, "The One with the Sonogram at the End serves mostly to move plot along and give us some character backstory".

References

External links
 

1994 American television episodes
Friends (season 1) episodes
Television episodes directed by James Burrows
American LGBT-related television episodes